Milan Film Festival (MFF), also known as Milano Film Festival, is an annual film festival held since 1996 in Milan, Italy. It was founded as a competition of only local short films. It became an international film festival in 1998 when it also started to awards its participants. In 1999, it began to show feature films commenced, and in the following year they started to compete for the Best Film Award.

Best Film winners
2000: The Irish Barbecue, directed by Pete Parwich (Germany/Ireland)
2001: Fotograf, directed by Kazim Öz (Turkey)
2002: Children of Love, directed by Geoffrey Enthoven (Belgium), and Song of the Sork, directed by Jonathan Foo and Nguyen Phan Quang Binh
2003: Nothing Is Certain, It's All In The Imagination...According To Fellini, directed by Susan Gluth
2004: In the Battlefields, directed by Danielle Arbid (France/Belgium/Lebanon), and Here, directed by Zrinko Ogresta
2005: Kept and Dreamless, directed by Martín De Salvo and Vera Fogwill (Argentina/Spain/Netherlands)
2006: Marilena from P7, directed by Cristian Nemescu (Romania)
2007: Reprise, directed by Joachim Trier (Norway)
2008: Still Orangutans, directed by Gustavo Spolidoro (Brazil)
2009: Left Handed, directed by Laurence Thrush (Japan)
2010: On the Other Side of Life, directed by Stefanie Brockhaus and Andy Wolff (Germany)
2011: Italy: Love It, or Leave It, directed by Luca Ragazzi and Gustav Hofer (Italy/Germany)
2012: China Heavyweight, directed by Yung Chang (Canada/China)
2013: You and the Night, directed by Yann Gonzalez (France)

References

External links

1996 establishments in Italy
Annual events in Italy
Festivals in Milan

Film festivals in Italy